The Officer Daryl R. Pierson Memorial Post Office Building is a historic post office building located at East Rochester in Monroe County, New York. It was designed and built 1936–1937, and is one of a number of post offices in New York State designed by the Office of the Supervising Architect of the Treasury Department, Louis A. Simon.  The one story brick building is in the Colonial Revival style and has a roof crowned by a flat topped cupola.  The entrance features fluted Doric columns and a blind fanlight with sculpted eagle.  The interior features a mural titled "Recreation Hours" by Bernard Gussow

It was listed on the National Register of Historic Places in 1988. In 2015, the post office was named for Daryl Pierson, an East Rochester native and Rochester police officer who was killed in the line of duty the previous year; the building was officially dedicated on June 4, 2016.

References

East Rochester
Government buildings completed in 1936
Colonial Revival architecture in New York (state)
Buildings and structures in Monroe County, New York
National Register of Historic Places in Monroe County, New York